The Swiss Basketball League, also known as SB League or SBL, is the top-tier professional club basketball league in Switzerland. It is organized by Swiss Basketball. The winners of the SBL are crowned Swiss national basketball champions. Currently, twelve teams compete in the league. Historically, Fribourg Olympic is the league's most successful team, as it has won a league-record 19 championships. Until 2017, the league was known as the Championnat LNA.

Promotion and relegation
The national professional club basketball competition of Switzerland is divided into two separate league levels, the top-tier level SBL, and the 2nd-tier level LNB, with a system of promotion and relegation between the two league levels.

Current teams

Title holders

 1931–32 Uni Bern
 1932–33 Servette
 1933–34 Urania Genève
 1934–35 Servette
 1935–36 Servette
 1936–37 Genève
 1937–38 Urania Genève
 1938–40 Not held
 1940–41 Urania Genève
 1941–42 Urania Genève
 1942–43 Urania Genève
 1943–44 Urania Genève
 1944–45 CAG Genève 
 1945–46 Urania Genève
 1946–47 Urania Genève
 1947–48 Urania Genève
 1948–49 Urania Genève
 1949–50 Stade Français Genève
 1950–51 Sanas Merry Boys
 1951–52 Jonction
 1952–53 Jonction
 1953–54 Jonction
 1954–55 Jonction
 1955–56 Jonction
 1956–57 Jonction
 1957–58 Urania Genève
 1958–59 Urania Genève
 1959–60 Stade Français Genève
 1960–61 Not held
 1961–62 Stade Français Genève
 1962–63 Sanas Merry Boys
 1963–64 Urania Genève
 1964–65 Urania Genève
 1965–66 Fribourg Olympic
 1966–67 Urania Genève
 1967–68 Stade Français Genève
 1968–69 Stade Français Genève
 1969–70 Stade Français Genève
 1970–71 Fribourg Olympic
 1971–72 Stade Français Genève
 1972–73 Fribourg Olympic
 1973–74 Fribourg Olympic
 1974–75 Federale
 1975–76 Federale
 1976–77 Federale
 1977–78 Fribourg Olympic
 1978–79 Fribourg Olympic
 1979–80 Viganello
 1980–81 Fribourg Olympic
 1981–82 Fribourg Olympic
 1982–83 Nyon
 1983–84 Vevey
 1984–85 Fribourg Olympic
 1985–86 Pully
 1986–87 Pully
 1987–88 Champel Genève
 1988–89 Pully
 1989–90 Pully

 1990–91 Vevey
 1991–92 Fribourg Olympic
 1992–93 Fidefinanz Bellinzona 
 1993–94 Fidefinanz Bellinzona 
 1994–95 Fidefinanz Bellinzona 
 1995–96 Monthey
 1996–97 Benetton Fribourg Olympic
 1997–98 Benetton Fribourg Olympic
 1998–99 Benetton Fribourg Olympic
 1999–00 Lugano Tigers
 2000–01 Lugano Tigers
 2001–02 Lugano Tigers
 2002–03 Boncourt
 2003–04 Boncourt
 2004–05 Monthey
 2005–06 Lugano Tigers
 2006–07 Benetton Fribourg Olympic
 2007–08 Benetton Fribourg Olympic
 2008–09 Vacallo
 2009–10 Lugano Tigers
 2010–11 Lugano Tigers
 2011–12 Lugano Tigers
 2012–13 Lions de Genève
 2013–14 Lugano Tigers
 2014–15 Lions de Genève
 2015–16 Fribourg Olympic
 2016–17 Monthey
 2017–18 Fribourg Olympic
 2018–19 Fribourg Olympic
 2019–20 season cancelled due to coronavirus pandemic
 2020–21 Fribourg Olympic

Performance by club
Source:

Bold indicates clubs which will play in the 2018–19 Swiss Basketball League.

Performance by canton

See also
 Swiss Basketball Cup (Federation Cup)
 Swiss Basketball League Cup (League Cup)

References

External links 
 League Home 
 Eurobasket.com League Page

 
Basketball leagues in Switzerland
Switzerland
1931 establishments in Switzerland
Sports leagues established in 1931
Professional sports leagues in Switzerland